Harvard Bioscience, Inc. is a global developer, manufacturer and marketer of life sciences equipment to support research and drug discovery. It is traded on NASDAQ under HBIO.

Headquartered in Holliston, Massachusetts, United States, the company has 20 wholly owned subsidiaries.  Brands include: AHN Biotechnologie, Biochrom, BioDrop, BTX, CMA, Coulbourn Instruments, Harvard Apparatus, HEKA, Hoefer, Hugo Sachs Elektronik, Multichannel Systems, Panlab, Scie-Plas, and Warner Instruments. Its CEO is James Green. The company has approximately 500 employees, with 300 of those in the USA, and five principal manufacturing facilities in New Brighton, Minnesota, Holliston, Massachusetts, Reutlingen, Germany, Barcelona, Spain, and March, Germany.

History
Harvard Bioscience was founded in 1901 by Dr. William T. Porter. He began manufacturing his own high quality physiology teaching equipment in the basement of the Harvard Medical School. Dr. Porter went on to found the American Journal of Physiology and became one of the leading physiologists of his day.

The company invented the mechanical syringe pump in the 1950s and a computer-controlled dosing pump in the 1980s.

In the early 1980s, the company started using the name Harvard Bioscience; the name was not officially changed to Harvard Bioscience, Inc. until 2000. The company completed their initial public offering on December 7, 2000. The names Harvard Apparatus and Harvard Bioscience are used pursuant to a license agreement between Harvard University and Harvard Bioscience, Inc.

The company spun off Harvard Apparatus Regenerative Technology, Inc., which is now known as Biostage, in 2013. They produce trachea scaffolds and bioreactors. Biostage has litigation over wrongful death pending that may affect Harvard Bioscience.

In 2014, the company acquired Multi Channel Systems MCS GmbH (MCS) and Triangle BioSystems, Inc. (TBSI).

In 2015 the company acquired HEKA Electronik of Germany.

In 2018 Harvard Bioscience acquired St. Paul, Minnesota-based Data Sciences International for $71 million. The company also sold their Denville Scientific subsidiary to Thomas Scientific for $20 million. Robert Gagnon, CFO, resigned in August 2018.

In July 2019, Chane Graziano, CEO, resigned. Graziano entered into a consulting agreement with the company in March 2020.

In 2019, the company's gross revenue was $116 million, down from $120.7 million in 2018. The company ended the year with $55 million in loans, down from $62.4 million in loans at the end of 2018. Loans were through Cerberus Capital. In September 2019 the company announced a restructuring program, including closing their Connecticut operation, downsizing in United Kingdom, and a reduction in force of over 10% of headcount. James Green was appointed President and CEO in July 2019, also adding Michael Rossi as CFO, replacing Kamalam Unninayar, who resigned in May 2019.

During the COVID-19 pandemic, Harvard Bioscience received $6.1 million in federally backed small business loans from PNC Bank as part of the Paycheck Protection Program. The company received scrutiny over this loan, which was aimed at small businesses.

Products

Harvard Bioscience offers a wide array of products for life science research.  Their product portfolio is broken into five market segments: Fluidics, Laboratory Equipment & Supplies, Molecular Analysis, Cell Analysis, and Physiology.

Finance
The revenue of the company grew from $11.5 million in 1997 to $108.2 million in 2010, a CAGR of 19%. The revenue of the company for fy 2013 reached 105.57 million with the profit margin of 0.12% and operation margin of -1.01%. On November 13, 2013, Harvard Bioscience Inc. announced its allocation of tax basis for spin-off of Harvard Apparatus Regenerative Technology.

References
Notes

Life science companies based in Massachusetts
Technology companies based in the Boston area
Companies based in Middlesex County, Massachusetts
Holliston, Massachusetts
Technology companies established in 1901
1901 establishments in Massachusetts